Anders Ejnar Andersen (1912–2006) was a Danish politician who was a member of Venstre and held various government posts, including minister finance and minister of economic affairs in the 1970s and 1980s.

Early life and education
Andersen was born in Voldby on 1 October 1912. He attended Ladelund agricultural school in the period 1935–1936.

Career
Andersen became a member of the Danish parliament for the Venstre representing Aarhus County and then Randers County in three terms between September 1971 and December 1981. He was the minister of finance in the cabinet led by Poul Hartling from 19 December 1973 to 13 February 1975. Then he served as the minister of economic affairs and minister of taxation between 30 August 1978 and 26 October 1979. He also served as the minister of economic affairs from 10 September 1982 to 10 September 1987.

Personal life and death
Andersen married Karen Margrethe Bilde Sørensen in Voldby on 10 October 1937. He had a farm near Voldby. He died in Voldby on 13 April 2006 and was buried there.

References

1912 births
2006 deaths
Danish Finance Ministers
Government ministers of Denmark
Members of the Folketing 1971–1973
Members of the Folketing 1973–1975
Members of the Folketing 1975–1977
Members of the Folketing 1977–1979
Members of the Folketing 1979–1981
20th-century Danish farmers
21st-century farmers
Venstre (Denmark) politicians